50th National Board of Review Awards
December 19, 1978

The 50th National Board of Review Awards were announced on December 19, 1978.

Top Ten Films 
Days of Heaven
Coming Home
Interiors
Superman
Movie Movie
Midnight Express
An Unmarried Woman
Pretty Baby
Girlfriends
Comes a Horseman

Top Foreign Films 
Autumn Sonata
Dear Detective
Madame Rosa
A Slave of Love
Bread and Chocolate

Winners 
Best Film: 
Days of Heaven
Best Foreign Film: 
Autumn Sonata
Best Actor: 
Jon Voight - Coming Home
Laurence Olivier - The Boys from Brazil
Best Actress: 
Ingrid Bergman - Autumn Sonata
Best Supporting Actor: 
Richard Farnsworth - Comes a Horseman
Best Supporting Actress: 
Angela Lansbury - Death on the Nile
Best Director: 
Ingmar Bergman - Autumn Sonata

External links 
National Board of Review of Motion Pictures :: Awards for 1978

1978
1978 film awards
1978 in American cinema